My Love is the third album by Korean duo male group J-Walk. In this album, J-Walk collaborated with their former Sechskies leader Eun Ji Won for a song called "My Love". The featured song "My Love" is a fast dance song with an electronic rhythm and "J-Walk style" ballad line.

Track listing

References

 

2008 albums
J-Walk (South Korean band) albums